Fuzhulei Ruodi, born Diaotaomogao, was a Chanyu of the Xiongnu Empire, the son and successor of Huhanye. He ruled the Xiongnu Empire from 31 BC to 20 BC. Fuzhulei kept the peace with the Han dynasty and visited Chang'an in 25 BC. He died in 20 BC and was succeeded by his brother Jumixu, the Souxie Chanyu.

Footnotes

References

Bichurin N.Ya., "Collection of information on peoples in Central Asia in ancient times", vol. 1, Sankt Petersburg, 1851, reprint Moscow-Leningrad, 1950

Taskin B.S., "Materials on Sünnu history", Science, Moscow, 1968, p. 31 (In Russian)

Chanyus
1st-century BC rulers in Asia
20 BC deaths